KNA may refer to:

 Kurdistan National Assembly

 Kuwait National Assembly
 Saint Kitts and Nevis
 Korean National Airlines (defunct)
 Korean National Association
Kuki National Army